Major-General George Glas Sandeman Carey   (13 February 1867 – 5 March 1948) was an officer in the British Army who, during World War I, prevented a breakthrough of the German forces to Amiens in the Second Battle of the Somme in 1918 by assembling a scratch force of British and American troops.

He was made a Companion of the Order of the Bath in the 1916 Birthday Honours.

References

1867 births
1948 deaths
British Army generals of World War I
Companions of the Order of the Bath
Military personnel from London
British Army major generals